Astrit Hafizi (born 15 September 1953) is a former Albanian footballer and coach of Vllaznia, as well as coach of Albania for a two years span (1997–1999).

Playing career

Club
Born in Shkodër, Hafizi was brought to Shkëndija Tiranë by Zyber Konçi, but was ordered back to Shkodër and played the remainder of his career with hometown club Vllaznia with whom he won two league titles in a team also featuring international player Luan Vukatana. In 1976 however, he was temporarily "loaned" to Dinamo Tirana to play for them in the Balkans Cup. He played both home games against Dinamo Zagreb and Ethnikos but was unexpectedly expelled from the team for the away matches and subsequently returned to Vllaznia. He later also played with Vukatana for 17 Nëntori in the Balkans Cup against Larissa.

Managerial career
When Vllaznia released him at only 31 years of age, because they wanted a new and younger team, the club persuaded him to become a coach and he became manager of the club a year later, replacing Ramazan Rragami.

In November 1987, Hafizi was suspended for two years by the communist regime for his role in a defection of Vllaznia players Lulëzim Bërshemi and Arvid Hoxha in Athens after a 1987–88 European Cup Winners' Cup match away against RoPS. He was, alongside club captain Ferid Rragami and two staff members, set to work in Pult as a school teacher and brought back to Shkodër 6 months later after the communist party leaders said he had "learned from his mistake". He was suspended by the authorities once more in 1991 for an incident in London with the Albania U-21 team.

Personal life
His brother-in-law is Hysen Dedja, who also played for and managed Vllaznia.

Honours
 as a player
Albanian Superliga: 2
 1978, 1983

 as a manager
Albanian Superliga: 1
 1992

References

1953 births
Living people
Footballers from Shkodër
Albanian footballers
Association football midfielders
Shkëndija Tiranë players
FK Dinamo Tirana players
KF Vllaznia Shkodër players
Albanian football managers
KF Vllaznia Shkodër managers
Albania national football team managers
FK Dinamo Tirana managers
KF Tirana managers
Kategoria Superiore managers